Drzonowo  is a village in the administrative district of Gmina Biały Bór, within Szczecinek County, West Pomeranian Voivodeship, in north-western Poland.

For the history of the region, see History of Pomerania.

The village has a population of 190.

Notable residents
 Margarete Bieber (1879 – 1978), art historian

References

Drzonowo